Zhug , sahawiq or bisbas is a hot sauce originating in Yemeni cuisine. In other countries of the Arabian Peninsula it is also called ma'booj.

Etymology 
The word sahawiq comes from the Arabic root (s-ḥ-q) which means to pestle or to crush.

Varieties
Sahawiq is one of the main ingredients of saltah. Wazif (traditional Yemeni dried baby sardines) is sometimes added to the sahawiq'''s ingredients and it is known as sahawiq wazif.

Red zhug is made with red peppers while green zhug is made with green peppers, or jalapeños. Zhug may be referred to by the generic term  (lit. "hot/spicy"). Also known as zhoug, it is a popular condiment at Israeli falafel and shawarma stands, and served with hummus.

Preparation
Zhug is made from fresh red or green hot peppers (like jalapeño) seasoned with coriander, garlic, salt, black cumin (optional) and parsley, and then mixed with olive oil. Some also add lemon juice, caraway seed, cardamom, and black pepper.

Traditional Yemeni cooks prepare sahawiq using two stones: a large stone called marha' (مرهى) used as a work surface and a smaller one called wdi (ودي) for crushing the ingredients. Alternative options are a mortar and pestle or a food processor. Yemenis sometimes add Pulicaria jaubertii.

See also

 Ajika, a hot dip in Caucasian cuisine
 Harissa, a hot chili pepper paste in Maghreb cuisine
 Muhammara or acuka'', a hot pepper dip in Levantine cuisine
 Pesto, a sauce made with crushed herbs and garlic in Italian cuisine
 Arab cuisine
 Cuisine of the Mizrahi Jews
 List of dips
 List of sauces

References

Arabic words and phrases
Arab cuisine
Chili paste
Hot sauces
Israeli cuisine
Middle Eastern cuisine
Mizrahi Jewish cuisine
Yemeni cuisine
South Asian cuisine